The Scottish Government Net Zero Directorates are a group of Directorates of the Scottish Government. The group was created in July 2021, with Agriculture & Rural Economy, Marine Scotland, Energy & Climate Change, Environment & Forestry, Transport Scotland, Forestry and Land Scotland and Scottish Forestry moving from the Economy Directorates.

The individual Directorates within the DG (Director-General) Net Zero family (the Net Zero Directorates) report to the Director-General, Roy Brannen.

Ministers 
There is no direct relationship between Ministers and the Directorates. However, the activities of the Directorates include those under the purview of the Cabinet Secretary for Net Zero, Energy and Transport, Michael Matheson MSP, and the Cabinet Secretary for Rural Affairs and Islands, Mairi Gougeon MSP. They are supported in their work by the Minister for Environment, Biodiversity and Land Reform.

Directorates
The overarching Scottish Government Directorates were preceded by similar structures called "Departments" that no longer exist (although the word is still sometimes erroneously used in this context). As an overarching unit, the  Net Zero Directorates incorporate a number of individual Directorates entitled:

  Agriculture and Rural Economy Directorate
  Energy and Climate Change Directorate
  Environment and Forestry Directorate
  Marine Scotland Directorate

Agencies and other bodies
The Directorates are responsible for three agencies:
 Transport Scotland
 Forestry and Land Scotland
 Scottish Forestry

The Directorates also sponsor several non-departmental public bodies including: 
 Cairngorms National Park Authority
 Crofters Commission
 Loch Lomond and the Trossachs National Park Authority
 James Hutton Institute
 Royal Botanic Garden Edinburgh
 Scottish Environment Protection Agency
 Quality Meat Scotland
 NatureScot

and share with the UK Government and other administrations in sponsorship of the Sea Fish Industry Authority, the Agriculture and Horticulture Development Board and the British Wool Marketing Board.

History
Before the creation of the Net Zero Directorates in June 2021, the group of directorates were part of the Environment Directorates.  Prior to 2007, the work had been carried out by the old Scottish Executive Environment and Rural Affairs Department (SEERAD).

References

External links
 Forestry Commission Scotland
 Scottish Government Senior Management Structure from 2007-2010 (pdf)

Directorates of the Scottish Government
Economy of Scotland
Climate change in Scotland
Scottish coast and countryside
Science and technology in Scotland
Environment of Scotland
Environmental organisations based in Scotland
Forestry agencies in Scotland
Scotland